Singapore Life Church (Abbreviation: SLC) is a reformed church  located on Prinsep Street within the Central Region of Singapore. Founded in 1883, the church is one of the oldest Presbyterian churches in Singapore. Its moderating minister is Rev. Dr. Caleb Soo.

History
Singapore Life Church, initially known as “Teck Khah Tng”,  was founded by Rev. John A. B. Cook in 1883. In 1917, the church purchased a piece of land at 142-144 Prinsep Street. It commenced with the construction of its first building in 1928. A year later, the church was renamed "Say Mia Tng Teck Khak". The goal of the church was to promote bible knowledge and Christianity.

In October 1950, the English Worship Service was established by Rev. Timothy Tow Siang Hui. More than 100 members attended the evening services at the church’s main sanctuary.

In 1955, the church’s session court resolved to split the church into three congregations, namely, “Teck Khah” (Singapore Life Church), “Newton” (the present-day Newton Life Church) and the “English Service” (now the Life Bible-Presbyterian Church). A vote was cast and the results were 332, 107 and 129, respectively.

In 1956, the church rented a plot of land at Changi 10th Milestone to spread the Gospel. It was called the Changi Outreach Station. Three years later, the Yok See School and its affiliated kindergarten on Prinsep Street were relocated to its new campus in Newton. In October 1962, the “English Service” congregation, constituted as Life Bible-Presbyterian Church in 1955, moved to Newton (Gilstead Road). 

In 1969, the church’s session court decided to rebuild the 40-year-old church on Prinsep Street. On 30 March 1975, the foundation stone for the new building was laid by Rev. Stephen C.K. Tan, the Moderator of the Synod of the Presbyterian Church in Singapore. In December 1975, the church building was completed and renamed "Singapore Life Church”. It was dedicated by Rev. Paul Hsiu, Moderator of the Synod on 29 May 1977.

Architecture

The church underwent a third rebuilding in 2010. Designed by Laud Architects, the notable features of the church are its monolithic roof and aluminium filigree façade.

The façade is made up of three sections of perforated panels which are “sewn” together by black external staircases which culminate in a large Cross.

Overall, the seven-storey structure is arranged as a three-storey podium topped with a four-storey block above. The car park, located on the first floor, is  enclosed within aluminium T-profiled louvres, screening the activity within and providing ‘uplift’ to the floors above.

At night, the church is illuminated from within and shafts of light are emitted through these small breaks in the façade and a glass expanse in the centre.

Internally, the building offers two key volumes and a number of breakout spaces such as prayer rooms and communal gathering areas. There is also a main sanctuary and a smaller chapel within the complex.

During the construction stage, reinforced concrete structures were used with post-tensioned beams to create column-free spaces within the building.

The construction of the church’s third rebuilding was completed in 2012. The first Sunday services were held on 1 July 2012.

See also 

 Presbyterian Church in Singapore
 Life Bible-Presbyterian Church
 Prinsep Street Presbyterian Church
 Christianity in Singapore

References

Further reading 
National Heritage Board (2002), Singapore's 100 Historic Places, Archipelago Press, 
Norman Edwards, Peter Keys (1996), Singapore - A Guide to Buildings, Streets, Places, Times Books International,

External links 
Singapore Life Church website
Presbyterian Church in Singapore website
The Presbyterian Church in Singapore 130 Years www.YouTube.com

Churches in Singapore
Presbyterian churches in Singapore
Religious organizations established in 1883
Rochor
19th-century architecture in Singapore